Xanthe Montes is a mountain range on the planet Mars. The name Xanthe Montes is a classical albedo feature name. This was approved by International Astronomical Union in 2006.

See also
 List of mountains on Mars

References

External links 
 Gazetteer of Planetary Nomenclature

Mountain ranges on Mars